Joaquín Pedraja Reyes (known professionally as Joaquín Cortés; born 22 February 1969) is a Spanish classically trained ballet and flamenco dancer.

Biography
Joaquin Cortés is a Spanish flamenco dancer. A native of Córdoba, Cortés showed interest in dancing from an early age. Cortés and his family moved to Madrid in 1981. Soon after moving to Madrid, he began to take formal dancing lessons and studying seriously.

In 1984, he was accepted as a member of Spanish prestigious national ballet company. He traveled the world with the Spanish National Ballet, performing in important venues such as the Metropolitan Opera House (Lincoln Center) of New York and the Kremlin Palace in Moscow. During his stint with the Spanish National Ballet, he also became a principal solo performer known for his phenomenal stamina and athleticism.

Desiring more creative control, Cortés formed the Joaquín Cortés Flamenco Ballet company and launched his first international tour 'Cibayí' in 1992. The formation of Cortés' own company allowed him to diverge from purist ballet and create his own fusion of flamenco, ballet and modern dance. In 1995, in addition to being featured in two international films- 'La flor de mi secreto' (The Flower of My Secret) and Carlos Saura's 'Flamenco', Joaquín Cortés embarked on what is often considered his most successful venture, 'Pasión Gitana' (Gypsy Passion). 'Pasión Gitana' marked the beginning of Cortés' recognition for not only his prowess as a dancer, but also as a choreographer and artistic director. In 1999 Cortés was the subject of a documentary film and he launched a successful tour of 'Soul' across North and South America. In the 1990s Joaquín Cortés gained notoriety for his close relationships with high-profile celebrities such as Naomi Campbell, Giorgio Armani and Mira Sorvino.

Continuing into the millennium, Cortés' focus shifted from dancing to choreography and artistic direction. He continues to dance in a limited capacity live on stage, in film and television. In 2000, landed a role in the film 'Gitano' (Gypsy) and again in 2004 in 'Vaniglia e cioccolato' (Vanilla and Chocolate). In 2001, he also made a guest appearance on Jennifer Lopez's concert in Puerto Rico. In 2004, Cortés was involved in the international tour of 'De Amor y Odio' that took him to England, Portugal, Thailand and New York, among other places. 2007 marked the beginning of Joaquín Cortés most recent spectacle, 'Mi Soledad.' On 15 May 2007 he performed as a guest dancer in a high-profile semi-final segment on ABC's "Dancing with the Stars."

Cortes is also the visual inspiration for the character Vamp from the Metal Gear video game series.

Shows
 Cibayí
 Pasión Gitana
 Soul
 Live
 De Amor y Odio
 Mi Soledad
 Unleashed (2009)
 Esencia (2017)

Filmography
 La flor de mi secreto (1995) — Antonio
 Flamenco (1995) — himself
 Gitano (2000) — Andres Heredia
 Vaniglia e Cioccolato (2004) — Carlos
 Mask Singer: Adivina quién canta (2021) - Erizo/Winner

See also
 List of dancers

References

Official Joaquín Cortés website
Joaquín Cortés filmography on IMDB
Joaquín Cortés information, products and streaming media
Joaquín Cortés biography and products
CNN interview with Joaquín Cortés
Video: Joaquín Cortés talks about Madrid for CNN and Nokia's feature series "The Scene" .

1969 births
Living people
People from Córdoba, Spain
Spanish male ballet dancers
Spanish male dancers
Spanish Romani people
Romani dancers
Romani male actors
Flamenco dancers
ACT Music artists
20th-century Spanish male actors
21st-century Spanish male actors
Masked Singer winners